Harrisburg is a community that is now (originally documented as Harrisburgh, then shortened to Harrisburg in 1892) located within the city of Houston, Texas, United States.

The community is located east of downtown Houston, south of the Brays Bayou and Buffalo Bayou junction, and west of Brady's Island. It was founded before 1825 on the eastern stretches of the Buffalo Bayou in present-day Harris County, Texas, on land belonging to John Richardson Harris. In 1926, Harrisburg was annexed into the city of Houston. The original name of Harris County was Harrisburg (Harrisburgh) County until it was shortened after the demise of the City of Harrisburg. Historical markers at the John Richardson Harris site tell of Santa Anna's razing the town on his way through chasing Houston and his retreating army just before they reached Lynch's ferry.

History

Mexican Texas
Harrisburg was surveyed in 1826 and formally named Harrisburg by its founder, John Richardson Harris. Harris named the town both after himself and after Harrisburg, Pennsylvania, which had been named for his great-grandfather.

Texas Republic
John Kirby Allen and Augustus Chapman Allen wanted to establish a new town upstream from Galveston Bay. The location of Harrisburg, which had been platted by Harris in 1826, was the Allen brothers' first choice. They could not buy Harrisburg since Harris was dead, and no clear title to the land existed. The brothers founded the city of Houston in an area which was their second choice.

In 1835, the General Council of Texas, a provisional government of Texas, made Harrisburg its capital. On April 16, 1836, during the Texas Revolution, almost all of Harrisburg was burned by the forces of Antonio López de Santa Anna. After the Texas Revolution ended, the city of Houston was founded just west of Harrisburg and was named county seat of Harrisburg (later shortened to Harris) County and capital of the Republic of Texas.

After Texas Annexation
In 1851, the chief engineer of the Buffalo Bayou, Brazos, and Colorado Railway (B.B.B. & C.), surveyed the route between Harrisburg and the Brazos River. It began operations on January 1, 1853. Harrisburg was the starting point of the line, the first functioning railroad line in the state.

After the Civil War, the railroad expanded and changed its name to the Galveston, Harrisburg and San Antonio Railway. Harrisburg remained an important rail town until a fire in the 1870s destroyed the rail yards, which were rebuilt in Houston.

The population of Harrisburg dwindled with the loss of the railroads and with the widening of the Houston Ship Channel in 1919. In December 1926, the City of Houston annexed Harrisburg.  The 1926 annexation of the Harrisburg area added  of land to the city limits.

Government and infrastructure
Harrisburg is in Houston City Council District I.

The United States Postal Service operates the Harrisburg Post Office at 8330 Manchester Street. In July 2011 the USPS announced that the post office may close.

The Harris Health System (formerly Harris County Hospital District) designated the Ripley Health Center for the ZIP code 77012. In 2000 Ripley was replaced by the Gulfgate Health Center. The designated public hospital is Ben Taub General Hospital in the Texas Medical Center.

Demographics
In the city of Houston-defined Harrisburg/Manchester Super Neighborhood, which also includes Manchester, there were 2,926 residents in 2015. 82% were Hispanics, 14% were non-Hispanic blacks, and 3% were non-Hispanic whites. The percentages of non-Hispanic Asians and others were both zero. In 2000 the super neighborhood had 3,768 residents. 88% were Hispanics, 6% were non-Hispanic blacks, and 5% were non-Hispanic whites. The percentages of non-Hispanic Asians and others were both zero.

Education

Primary and secondary schools

Public schools
Harrisburg is served by the Houston Independent School District.

Many area residences are zoned to J. R. Harris Elementary School, including everything east of Broadway and some areas west of it, generally north and/or on Elm. Some are zoned to Dávila Elementary School. Residences are zoned to Deady Middle School, and Milby High School.

The area was previously in the Harrisburg Independent School District. J. R. Harris opened as Harrisburg School in 1895. A school for black students, also called Harrisburg School, opened in 1904. In 1952 that school for black students moved into a new building and was renamed "Kay Elementary School", after its first principal, who had been Savannah Georgia Kay. Kay Elementary School closed in 1978. Students at Chávez High School use the former Kay Elementary School as a "land lab".

Public libraries
Harrisburg is served by the Stanaker Branch of Houston Public Library.

See also

References

Other resources

Capitals of former nations
Neighborhoods in Houston
History of Houston
Texas Revolution